Jesús Ricardo Morales Manzo (born 17 February 1982) is a Mexican politician from the Party of the Democratic Revolution. From 2008 to 2009 he served as Deputy of the LX Legislature of the Mexican Congress representing Guerrero.

References

1982 births
Living people
Politicians from Guerrero
Party of the Democratic Revolution politicians
21st-century Mexican politicians
Deputies of the LX Legislature of Mexico
Members of the Chamber of Deputies (Mexico) for Guerrero